The MV Voyager was a freight and passenger ferry which was operated by Transeuropa Ferries.

History
The Eurovoyager was launched by Belliard Hoboken as the Prins Albert in 1978 for Regie voor Maritiem Transport Belgie on their Ostend to Dover route.
In 1994 she was transferred to the Ostend Ramsgate route.
In 1998 she was bought by Denval Marine Consultants and renamed Eurovoyager.
She was chartered to Sally Line in the same year, but was only used for a few months as in November of the same year she was transferred to Transeuropa Ferries for use on their Ostend Ramsgate route. In July 2009, a Marine Accident Investigation Branch report revealed that Eurovoyager had regularly been operated with her watertight doors open, in breach of maritime regulations. She was scrapped on 27 April 2012.

Sister ships

 M/F Primrose - originally Princesse Marie Christine, 1975.
 M/F Al Arabia - originally Princesse Maria-Esmeralda, 1975

References

1977 ships
Transeuropa Ferries